"Oh My Heart" is a song by American alternative rock band R.E.M. It was released as the fourth single from the band's fifteenth studio album Collapse into Now on February 1, 2011. Its music video was directed by Jem Cohen.

As a tribute to the band, who were formed in Athens, Georgia, the University of Georgia features the song in several public service announcements which air during sporting events.

Track listing
 CD single (Germany)
 "Oh My Heart" – 3:20
 "Nola-4/26/10" – 2:53

 7-inch single
 "Oh My Heart" – 3:20
 "Harborcoat" (live in Riga, Latvia) – 3:44

 Digital download (Germany)
 "Oh My Heart" – 3:20
 "Nola-4/26/10" – 2:53
 "That Someone Is You" (live in studio) – 1:45
 "It Happened Today" – 3:45

Charts

References

2011 singles
Songs about New Orleans
R.E.M. songs
Song recordings produced by Jacknife Lee
Song recordings produced by Michael Stipe
Song recordings produced by Mike Mills
Song recordings produced by Peter Buck
Songs written by Peter Buck
Songs written by Michael Stipe
Songs written by Mike Mills
Songs written by Scott McCaughey
Warner Records singles